Govind Swaminadhan (9 October 1909 – 30 September 2003) was an Indian lawyer who served as the Advocate-General of Tamil Nadu from 1969 to 1976. He also served as president of the Madras Bar Association.

Early life and education 
Govind was born on 9 October 1909 to lawyer Subbarama Swaminathan, an Iyer Brahmin, and his Nair wife Ammu Swaminathan. He was the oldest of four siblings, the others being Lakshmi Sehgal (1914-2012,  Mrinalini Sarabhai (1918-2016) and Subbaram Swaminadhan . He had his education at Madras and Oxford and qualified as a barrister from the Inner Temple in 1935.

Career 
Govind practised at the Madras High Court serving as Crown Prosecutor and later as Standing Counsel for the Government of India. One of his important trials as Crown Prosecutor was the Lakshmikanthan Murder Case.

In 1969, Govind was appointed Advocate-General of Tamil Nadu during the tenure of the Dravida Munnetra Kazhagam government and served till 1976. Govind actively practised as a lawyer till 1997 when he was about 87 years old.

References 
 

1909 births
2003 deaths
Advocates General for Tamil Nadu
20th-century Indian lawyers